Chaman Jafar Beyg (also Romanized as Chaman Ja‘far Beyg and Chamanī-ye Ja‘far Beyk; also known as Chaman-e Ja‘far, Chaman-e Ja‘far Beyg-e Soflá, Chaman Ja‘far, and Chaman Ja‘far Beyg-e Pā’īn) is a village in Kakavand-e Sharqi Rural District, Kakavand District, Delfan County, Lorestan Province, Iran. At the 2006 census, its population was 56, in 12 families.

References 

Towns and villages in Delfan County